Goodenia integerrima, commonly known as gypsum goodenia,  is a species of flowering plant in the family Goodeniaceae and is endemic to the south-west of Western Australia. It is a low-lying to ascending, perennial herb with linear leaves clustered on the stems, and umbels of yellow flowers with a brownish centre.

Description

Taxonomy and naming
Goodenia integerrima was first formally described in 1990 by Roger Charles Carolin in the journal Telopea from material collected in 1965 by Alex George near Lake King. The specific epithet (integerrima) means "undivided", referring to the leaves.

Distribution and habitat
This goodenia grows on elevated sandy islets in salt lakes near Lake King in the south-west of Western Australia.

Conservation status
Goodenia integerrimais classified as "Threatened Flora (Declared Rare Flora — Extant)" by the Department of Environment and Conservation (Western Australia) and an Interim Recovery Plan has been prepared.

References

integerrima
Eudicots of Western Australia
Plants described in 1990
Taxa named by Roger Charles Carolin
Endemic flora of Western Australia